Abu Danladi (born October 18, 1995) is a Ghanaian footballer.

Career

Amateur & College
Abu Danladi graduated from Ghana's Right to Dream Academy. He attended Dunn High School in Los Olivos, California. He played college soccer with the UCLA Bruins. Danladi received the Gatorade Player of the Year award in 2013–14 while playing for Dunn School.

Professional 
On January 4, 2017, Danladi signed a Generation Adidas contract with Major League Soccer. On January 13, Danladi was selected by the expansion Minnesota United with the first overall selection of the 2017 MLS SuperDraft.
He scored his first career MLS goal on May 7, 2017, at home versus Sporting Kansas City. He was the runner-up for the 2017 MLS Rookie of the Year Award, behind Julian Gressel.

On November 19, 2019, Danladi was selected by MLS expansion side Nashville SC in the 2019 MLS Expansion Draft. Following the 2021 season Danladi's contract expired with Nashville and he became a free agent.

Following his release from Nashville, Danladi returned to Minnesota United on 13 January 2022, signing a one-year deal. After the 2022 season, his contract option was declined by Minnesota.

Career statistics

References

External links

1995 births
Living people
Ghanaian footballers
Ghanaian expatriate footballers
UCLA Bruins men's soccer players
Ventura County Fusion players
Minnesota United FC players
Major League Soccer first-overall draft picks
Association football forwards
Expatriate soccer players in the United States
Minnesota United FC draft picks
USL League Two players
Major League Soccer players
Nashville SC players
Forward Madison FC players
USL League One players
MLS Next Pro players